Bhutanese may refer to:
 Something of, or related to Bhutan
 Dzongkha, the official national language of Bhutan (sometimes called "Bhutanese")
 A person from Bhutan, or of Bhutanese descent, see Demographics of Bhutan
 Bhutanese culture
 Bhutanese cuisine
 The Bhutanese, a weekly newspaper in Bhutan

See also 
Bhutani (disambiguation)
 
 :Category:Bhutanese people

Language and nationality disambiguation pages